Mooy may refer to:

People 
 Aaron Mooy (born 1990), Australian footballer
 Adrianus Mooy (born 1936), Indonesian economist
 Brodie Mooy (born 1990), Australian footballer
 Christoffel Joseph Mooy (1921–1971), politician
 Jan Mooy (1776–1847), Dutch painter
 Mooy Lambert (1550s–1625), Dutch vice admiral

Other uses 
 Mooy language, spoken in West Papua

See also 
 Muy (disambiguation)
 Moy (disambiguation)